Creighton Thomas Redman (born 1933), is a male former rower who competed for England.

Rowing career
He represented England and won a gold medal in the Coxless four at the 1958 British Empire and Commonwealth Games in Cardiff, Wales.

All four of the gold medal winning crew rowed for the National Provincial Bank Rowing Club.

References

1933 births
English male rowers
Commonwealth Games medallists in rowing
Commonwealth Games gold medallists for England
Rowers at the 1958 British Empire and Commonwealth Games
Living people
Medallists at the 1958 British Empire and Commonwealth Games